Jack Nichols is the name of:
Jack Nichols (painter) (1921–2009), Canadian painter
Jack Nichols (activist) (1938–2005), American LGBT activist
Jack Nichols (basketball) (1926–1992), American basketball player
Jack C. Nichols (1930–2007), American politician

See also
John Nichols (disambiguation)
Jack Nicholls (born 1943), British bishop